Bourbon-l'Archambault is a spa town and a commune in the Allier department in Auvergne-Rhône-Alpes region in central France. It is the place of origin of the House of Bourbon.

Population

Personalities
In 1681, Louise Marie Anne de Bourbon, Mademoiselle de Tours - the third daughter of Louis XIV and his mistress Françoise-Athénaise, Madame de Montespan - died there at the age of six. On 26 May 1707, Madame de Montespan herself also died at the chateau.

The town was Charles Maurice de Talleyrand-Périgord's favorite vacation spot.

In 1915, mathematician André Lichnerowicz was born here (died 1998).

See also
Communes of the Allier department
Bourbonnais
Borvo
House of Bourbon

References

External links

 Town hall website (in French)
 Tourist office website (in French)
 Romanesque art at Bourbon-l'Archambault
 Spa information (in French)

Communes of Allier
Spa towns in France
Bourbonnais
Allier communes articles needing translation from French Wikipedia